Ilya Igorevich Chernyak (born 19 May 2002) is a Belarusian football player who plays as a second striker for Russian club Akhmat Grozny.

Career
On 7 February 2023, Chernyak signed a contract with Russian Premier League club Akhmat Grozny until the end of the 2022–23 season, with an option to extend for additional three seasons. He made his RPL debut for Akhmat on 11 March 2023 in a game against Lokomotiv Moscow.

References

External links
 
 
 

2002 births
People from Gomel District
Sportspeople from Gomel Region
Living people
Belarusian footballers
Belarus under-21 international footballers
Association football forwards
FC Shakhtyor Soligorsk players
GNK Dinamo Zagreb II players
FC Akhmat Grozny players
Belarusian Premier League players
First Football League (Croatia) players
Russian Premier League players
Belarusian expatriate footballers
Expatriate footballers in Croatia
Belarusian expatriate sportspeople in Croatia
Expatriate footballers in Russia
Belarusian expatriate sportspeople in Russia